Ultra-low-voltage processors (ULV processors) are a class of microprocessor that are deliberately underclocked to consume less power (typically 17 W or below), at the expense of performance.

These processors are commonly used in subnotebooks, netbooks, ultraportables and embedded devices; where low heat dissipation and long battery life are required.

Notable examples
 Intel Atom – Up to 2.0 GHz at 2.4 W (Z550)
 Intel Pentium M – Up to 1.3 GHz at 5 W (ULV 773)
 Intel Core 2 Solo – Up to 1.4 GHz at 5.5 W (SU3500)
 Intel Core Solo – Up to 1.3 GHz at 5.5 W (U1500)
 Intel Celeron M – Up to 1.2 GHz at 5.5 W (ULV 722)
 VIA Eden – Up to 1.5 GHz at 7.5 W
 VIA C7 – Up to 1.6 GHz at 8 W (C7-M ULV)
 VIA Nano – Up to 1.3 GHz at 8 W (U2250)
 AMD Athlon Neo – Up to 1 GHz at 8 W (Sempron 200U)
 AMD Geode – Up to 1 GHz at 9 W (NX 1500)
 Intel Core 2 Duo – Up to 1.3 GHz at 10 W (U7700)
 Intel Core i3/i5/i7 – Up to 1.5 GHz at 13 W (Core i7 3689Y)
 AMD A Series – Up to 3.2 GHz at 15 W (A10-7300P)

See also
 Consumer Ultra-Low Voltage – a low power platform developed by Intel

References

Embedded systems
Microprocessors